Samuel Oros (born 15 April 1998) is a Slovak racing cyclist, who currently rides for UCI Continental team .

Major results
2015
 1st  Time trial, National Junior Road Championships
2016
 National Junior Road Championships
2nd Time trial
3rd Road race
2019
 National Under-23 Road Championships
1st  Road race
2nd Time trial

References

External links

1998 births
Living people
Slovak male cyclists
Place of birth missing (living people)